National parks in Hokkaido are 6 protected areas. 
Those are: Rishiri Rebun Sarobetsu National Park, Shiretoko National Park, Akan Mashu National Park, Kushiro Shitsugen National Park, Daisetsuzan National Park, and Shikotsu Toya National Park. Natural Parks, including the national park areas, are established in about 10% of the total land area of Hokkaido Prefecture.

History
The first parks were created in 1934.

List

 The Akan Mashu National Park was created in 1934.  The park covers 90,481 ha of north east Hokkaido.  Highlights of the park include
 Kawasu Onsen
 Mount Iō
 Tsutsujigahara
 Lake Mashū
 Lake Kussharo
 Bihoro Pass
 Mount Mokoto
 Wakoto Peninsula
 Mount Nishibetsu-dake

 Daisetsuzan National Park was created in 1934. Daisetsuzan is the largest national park in Japan. Its area includes 230,000 ha (568,000 acres) in the mountains in the center of Hokkaido.  Among its highlights are
 Sōunkyō Gorge     
 Kogen Onsen   
 Aizankei 
 Lake Shikaribetsu 
 Mikuni Pass

 Kushiro-shitsugen National Park was created in 1987.  The park includes
 Hoso'oka Observatory
 Onnenai
 Lake Toro
 
 Rishiri-Rebun-Sarobetsu National Park was created in 1974.  The park includes 
 Mount Rishiri
 Rebun Island
 Sarobetsu plain

 Shikotsu-Tōya National Park was created in 1949.  The park includes 
 Lake Shikotsu
 Noboribetsu Onsen
 Mount Yōtei
 Lake Tōya

 Shiretoko National Park was created in 1964. Shiretoko is a peninsula at the northeastern end of Hokkaido.  Its Ainu name means "land's end."  The park's  area includes 38,633 ha in Hokkaido. In 2005, Shiretoko was listed by UNESCO as a World Natural Heritage site (WHS). The WHS area include 71,100 ha.  The park includes
 Shiretoko Pass
 Furepe Falls
 Mt. Rausu-dake

See also
 Quasi-national parks

References

External links
 Hokkaido National Parks website

Lists of places in Japan
National parks of Japan
World Heritage Sites in Japan